Cop or Hood is a 1979 French crime and action film directed by Georges Lautner. It's loosely based on the novel L'Inspecteur de la mer by Michel Grisolia.

Plot 
Stanislas Borowitz is a divisional commissioner from the IGPN (Inspection Générale de la Police Nationale) who uses particularly expeditious methods to counteract the "ripoux" (French term for "corrupt cops"). Sent to Nice to struggle against the Mafia and enquire on a murder of a notoriously corrupt commissioner, he changes his identity into a thug named Antonio Cerruti to trigger a gang war between the two biggest local sponsors, Théodore Musard ("l'Auvergnat") and Achille Volfoni ("le Corse"), and discovers a police organization with the mafia of the town. But the corrupt police inspectors Rey and Massard, on the pay of Volfoni, absolutely want to harm him.

Cast 
 Jean-Paul Belmondo ... Antonio Cerutti (aka the divisional commissioner Stanislas Borowitz)
 Georges Géret ... Théodore Musard ("l'Auvergnat")
 Marie Laforêt ... Edmonde Puget-Rostand
 Jean-François Balmer ... Inspecteur Massard
  ... Achille Volfoni ("le Corse")
 Julie Jézéquel ... Charlotte
 Michel Beaune ... Marcel Langlois
 Tony Kendall ... Rey
  ... Simone Langlois
 Juliette Mills ... Madame Bertrand
 Venantino Venantini ... Mario
 Charles Gérard ... Cazauban
 Michel Galabru ... Commissaire Grimaud
 Philippe Castelli ... driving school inspector
  ... substitute
  ... Camille
 Nicolas Vogel ... Marcel Gaston

References

External links 

Cop or Hood at Le Film Guide

1970s crime action films
Films directed by Georges Lautner
French crime action films
Films with screenplays by Michel Audiard
Films scored by Philippe Sarde
1970s French-language films
1970s French films